Happy is the fourth studio album by Australian new wave band Real Life. The album was released in October 1997. At the time of release, Real Life consisted of David Sterry, Danny Simcic, Allan Johnson and George Pappas.

A 1999 limited edition release of Happy featured a bonus remix album called Happier.

Reception

Tomas Mureika from AllMusic said "The cover speaks volumes. The head that looks like a scary, puffy fish is indicative of the [band's] new direction... still very much in the synth pop vein, but now with a dangerous, dark gothic edge" adding "This is a dark, brooding record, but one which would craft the persona of Real Life for the next decade. Still very hook-laden, still very danceable -- but darker, more ominous and definitively more goth."

Track listing

Release history

References

1997 albums
Real Life (band) albums
Curb Records albums